USS Niobrara (AO-72) was a T3  constructed for the United States Navy during World War II.  She was the only U.S. Navy ship named for the Niobrara River in Nebraska.

The ship was laid down on 29 June 1942 by Bethlehem Steel Co., Sparrows Point, Maryland, as a type T3-S-A1 tanker named SS Citadel, under a Maritime Commission contract (MC hull 520). Launched on 28 November 1942, sponsored by Mrs. Mark O'Dea, she was acquired by the Navy and commissioned as USS Niobrara  on 13 March 1943.

Service history

World War II, 1943–1945
Shakedown and fueling-at-sea training completed, Niobrara sailed from Norfolk, Virginia, on 17 April 1943 to carry oil to Argentia, Newfoundland, then ferried oil from ports in Texas and Aruba, Netherlands West Indies, to Mediterranean ports to support operations in the invasions of North Africa and Sicily. In March 1944 she was altered at Norfolk for Pacific service, and sailed for the Panama Canal, Pearl Harbor, and Kwajalein where she fueled transports bound for the Marianas invasions begun in June 1944.

Niobrara served as station tanker at Eniwetok until July, then operated from that base fueling ships at sea, thus enabling carrier task forces to roam the western Pacific and the Philippine Sea without interrupting their strikes to return to port. On 1 October she arrived in Kossol Roads, Palaus, to serve as station tanker for smaller combatants patrolling during the assault and occupation of the Palaus, then for forces preparing for the return to the Philippines. On 8 January 1945, she herself proceeded to Leyte, then into the South China Sea to fuel task force TF 38, then attacking the China coast.
 
During the next two months, she served at Ulithi and Saipan fueling ships for the Iwo Jima invasion and preparing for the Okinawa campaign. She sailed 26 March from Ulithi for Okinawa, and after refueling 5th Fleet striking units at sea, closed Hagushi Beach on 5 April to fuel radar picket destroyers. Air and submarine alerts, as well as gunfire close ashore, required expert seamanship to refuel ships alongside while maneuvering to protect the ship. She continued to support ships patrolling off Okinawa and carrier striking forces until the end of the war.

Post-war activities, 1945–1946
Niobrara entered Tokyo Bay on 30 August to witness the surrender, and after three months' occupation duty, sailed for Guam, where she aided in salvage work. On 10 December she sailed for the Panama Canal and the east coast, along which she operated until decommissioning on 24 September 1946.

Atlantic Fleet, 1951–1954
She lay in reserve at Philadelphia, Pennsylvania, until recommissioning on 5 February 1951 for three years' service with the Atlantic Fleet along the east coast, in the Caribbean, and in the Mediterranean. On 13 June 1954 she arrived in San Diego, California, to join the Pacific Fleet's operations until decommissioning on 30 November 1954.

Pacific Fleet, 1956–1957
She recommissioned at San Francisco, California, on 14 December 1956 and again served in the Pacific Fleet until sailing to Galveston, Texas, where she decommissioned on 12 November 1957.

In reserve and disposal
She transferred to the Maritime Administration on 5 December 1957 and joined the National Defense Reserve Fleet at Beaumont, Texas. She was struck from the Naval Vessel Register on 1 February 1959, and disposed of by MARAD (Trade-in-exchange) on 22 March 1982, and then scrapped in Germany.

Awards
Niobrara received 4 battle stars for World War II service.

References

External links 
 

 

Chiwawa-class oilers
Ships built in Sparrows Point, Maryland
1942 ships
World War II auxiliary ships of the United States
World War II tankers of the United States